The Islamic Union of Iraqi Turkoman (or Turkoman Islamic Union) is a political party in Iraq led by Abbas al-Bayati. It was formed in 1991 and participated in discussions with other exile groups before the invasion of Iraq. It is mostly made up of Shiite Iraqi Turkmen.

In the elections in January 2005 and December 2005 it joined with other Shiite parties in the United Iraqi Alliance.

The deputy leader of the party is Jasim Mohammed Jaafar, who was the Minister of Housing and Construction in the 2005 Iraqi Transitional Government and Minister of Youth and Sports in the 2006 government of Nouri al-Maliki.

References 

Political parties established in 1991
Turkmen political parties in Iraq
Shia Islamic political parties
Political parties in Iraq
1991 establishments in Iraq